The Knuckey Peaks are a group of isolated peaks  southeast of the McLeod Nunataks and  west of the Doggers Nunataks in Enderby Land, Antarctica. The peaks were discovered and positioned in December 1958 by an Australian National Antarctic Research Expeditions dog-sledge party, and were named by the Antarctic Names Committee of Australia for Graham A. Knuckey, a surveyor at Mawson Station in 1958 and a member of the dog-sledge party.

References

Mountains of Enderby Land